Frederick John DeSarro (July 3, 1937 - November 1, 1978) was an American racecar driver. He was the 1970 NASCAR National Modified Champion. In NASCAR's Modified All-Time Top 10 drivers, he was ranked eighth.

Biography

Career
Fred DeSarro was a successful hydroplane racer as a late teenager in the Rhode Island area.  He was also raced go-karts, drag raced and was a competitive bowler before turning to auto racing.

Fred started his stock car racing career at the then Waterford Speedbowl driving Bob "Slim" Ross' #222 'Bounty Hunter' car. The team then moved over to the Norwood Arena Speedway by the mid 1960's.  Ross' team folded soon after and DeSarro built his own #11 Sportsman coupe.  He won the 1967 Sportsman Track Championship at Norwood.  He finished runner-up to the NASCAR Modified Championship in 1968.

In 1970, Fred won the NASCAR Modified National Championship driving the Sonny Koszela "Woodchopper" Special #15.  Among several tracks, they raced regularly that season at Albany-Saratoga on Friday nights and won the Modified Championship there as well. This was the only season he drove for the Koszela team.

In 1971, DeSarro started his association with Lenny Boehler and the "Ole Blue" #3, while Bugsy Stevens, who won 3 straight Modified Championships driving for Boehler, took over driving the Koszela car.

In 1972, DeSarro won the inaugural Spring Sizzler and went on to win the Stafford Motor Speedway Championship, and won the Stafford Modified Championship again in 1976.

In 1974 DeSarro won the first of four (1974–1977) consecutive Thompson Modified division track championships, winning 14 feature events alone during the 1974 season. Fred also won the Race of Champions (modified racing) at the Trenton Speedway in 1974 in a dramatic photo-finish over Stevens in the Koszela #15 car.

Fred DeSarro was critically injured during a practice session at the Thompson International Speedway on October 8, 1978 when his car launched over the sandbanks in turn 3.  He suffered a massive skull fracture. He died several weeks later on November 1, 1978.

Awards
1970: NASCAR National Modified Champion
1999: inducted into New England Auto Racers Hall of Fame

References

External links
http://www.vintagemodifieds.com/fred_desarro/
http://localracing.nascar.com/node/1625
http://www.near1.com/HALL-OF-FAME/1999/Desarro_Fred.htm

1937 births
1978 deaths
American racing drivers
NASCAR drivers